Paralithosia honei is a moth of the family Erebidae. It was described by Franz Daniel in 1954. It is found in China in Yunnan and Tibet.

References

Lithosiini
Moths described in 1954